The BVV Prague Open was a women's tennis tournament played on outdoor clay courts at the I. Czech Lawn Tennis Club in Prague in the Czech Republic that was part of WTA Tour. It was held from 1993 to 1994 with a prize money of $100.000.

South African Amanda Coetzer won both singles and doubles titles in the same edition.

Results

Singles

Doubles

See also
 1992 HTC Prague Open
 I.ČLTK Prague Open

References

External links
 WTA results archive
 WTA results archive

WTA Tour
Prague
Prague
Clay court tennis tournaments
Defunct tennis tournaments in the Czech Republic
Recurring sporting events established in 1993